The  is a popular Japanese brand notebook/daily planner manufactured by Hobo Nikkan Itoi Shinbun (Hobonichi).

Features
The planner's pages feature a 4 mm lined grid to maximize customization and is printed on Tomoe River (Tomoegawa) paper, a very thin and high quality paper. It is resistant to bleeding and feathering of inks and paints, especially fountain pen inks and watercolors, though alcohol-based pens will bleed through. The book is structured with a yearly overview section, monthly pages, various informational pages in the back, and most importantly, one full page dedicated to each day. Daily pages display the current moon phase, the day/week of the year, and short quotations from a variety of sources. The planner may be used in an optional cover with several useful features like card pockets, bookmarks, and a pen holder which doubles as a clasp. Covers are offered in a variety of materials and are sold in a different set of designs every year. The planner and covers are available in two sizes, the A6 'Original', and the larger A5 'Cousin'. Each Hobonichi Techo has a unique serial number printed on the final page, as a mark of its authenticity.

English-language version
In 2013, Hobonichi collaborated with designer brand ARTS&SCIENCE to release an English-language version of the planner for the first time. The English planner is available only in A6 size, differentiated by a black cover with gold stamped Japanese characters for planner, "手帳" (Techō), and the ARTS&SCIENCE logo, as opposed to the cream cover of the Japanese version.

References

External links 
Hobonichi Planner official site (English)
Hobonichi Techo official site (Japanese)
ARTS&SCIENCE official site (Japanese)

Japanese stationery